Sir William Ernest Cain, 1st Baronet, JP (7 May 1864 – 5 May 1924) was an English brewer and philanthropist.

Cain was the son of Robert Cain, who had founded a large brewing empire, Robert Cain & Sons Ltd. He was educated at Winwick Priory. The family firm was taken over as joint managing directors by William Cain and his brother, Charles Nall-Cain, who continued to develop the business.

During the First World War, Cain donated his old home, Wilton Manor at West Kirby, to the government as a convalescent hospital for officers and paid for its conversion and equipment. He also donated money to many other war charities. For these services, he was knighted in 1917 and created a baronet in the 1920 New Year Honours.

Cain married Florence Roberts in 1886. They had a son and a daughter. He died in 1924 at the age of sixty and was succeeded in the baronetcy by his only son, Ernest.

Footnotes

1864 births
1924 deaths
Baronets in the Baronetage of the United Kingdom
Knights Bachelor
English brewers
Businesspeople from Liverpool